Frank Pando is an American actor. Pando's screen acting career debuted in 1999 in the TV series The Sopranos as Agent Frank Grasso. He has since acted in several television shows, movies, and plays, including roles as policemen in The Visitor, Unbreakable Kimmy Schmidt, and Blue Bloods.

Life and career 
Frank Pando first distinguished himself as playing the character Agent Frank Grasso in the Television series The Sopranos. Pando also portrayed Pablo in the 2005 version of A Streetcar Named Desire, from Studio 54, and provided a voiceover for The Local Population in Red Dead Redemption. He has also acted in many other roles in several TV shows, and along with fellow actor Armando Riesco and his wife Shirley Rumierk, has a collaborative YouTube channel called "Rumando Pando". In 2017, he played “Angel” in the Lynne Ramsay film You Were Never Really Here, and was also cast in a starring role in a San Diego production of the play The Blameless.

Filmography
The Equalizer -  Captain Torres 2021
Katy Keene - Luis Lopez 2020
When They See Us - Detective Gonzalez 2019
You Were Never Really Here - Angel 2017
Bad Vegan and the Teleportation Machine - Luther 2016
Blue Bloods - Detective Puentes 2014
The Blacklist - George Wilkinson 2014
A Little Game - Officer 2014
Girl Most Likely - Policeman #1 2012
Man on a Ledge - Cameraman 2012
Bored to Death - Policeman at Carousel (Gumball!) 2011
Damages - John Rosetti (2 episodes) 2011
American Experience (TV series documentary) - Reenactment actor / Vicente Perez Rosales (2 episodes) 2006-2011
Red Dead Redemption (Video Game) - The Local Population (voice) 2010
Nurse Jackie (TV series) - Miguel (Caregiver) 2010
Law & Order: Criminal Intent - Max (1 episode) 2009
Law & Order (TV series) Bartender / Chris / Silvio Mangiafico – Bailout (2009) … Silvio Mangiafico – Bodies (2003) … Chris – Attorney Client (2002) … Bartender 2009
Children of Invention - Bruce 2009
Law & Order: Special Victims Unit (TV series) Jesse Bleyer 2007
The Visitor - Cop #2 2007
The Sopranos (TV series) Agent Frank Grasso / Agent Grasso / FBI Agent Frank Grasso – Made in America (2007) … Agent Frank Grasso – All Due Respect (2004) … Agent Frank Grasso – Irregular Around the Margins (2004) … Agent Frank Grasso – Rat Pack (2004) … Agent Frank Grasso – Whitecaps (2002) … Agent Grasso – Mr. Ruggerio's Neighborhood (2001) ... FBI Agent Frank Grasso See all 12 episodes » 2007
Live Free or Die - Trucker 2006Third Watch - Firefighter #3 (Honor) 2001Deadline - Murphy 2000The $treet'' - Fireman 2000

External links

Living people
American male film actors
American male television actors
Place of birth missing (living people)
Year of birth missing (living people)